Capo is a surname.  Notable people with the surname include:

 Anthony Capo (1959/1960–2012), Italian-American mobster
 Fran Capo (born 1959), motivational speaker, radio host, adventurer, comedian, voice-over artist, and writer
 Rene Capo (1961–2009), Cuban-American judoka

See also
 Caro (surname)